Arnbackia is a genus of ascidian tunicates in the family Styelidae.

Species within the genus Arnbackia include:
 Arnbackia novaezelandiae Brewin, 1950

References

Stolidobranchia
Tunicate genera